Willi Lesch (born 11 December 1942 in Munich) is a German former alpine skier who competed in the 1968 Winter Olympics and 1972 Winter Olympics. Competitions include Men's Downhill, Men's Giant Slalom, and Men's Slalom.

External links
 sports-reference.com
 

1942 births
Living people
German male alpine skiers
Olympic alpine skiers of West Germany
Alpine skiers at the 1968 Winter Olympics
Alpine skiers at the 1972 Winter Olympics
Skiers from Munich
20th-century German people